Sneh Chousurin (born 26 January 1952) is a Thai fencer. He competed in the individual and team épée events at the 1976 Summer Olympics.

References

External links
 

1952 births
Living people
Sneh Chousurin
Sneh Chousurin
Fencers at the 1976 Summer Olympics